Limicolariopsis is a genus of gastropods belonging to the family Achatinidae.

The species of this genus are found in Africa.

Species:

Limicolariopsis cylindrica 
Limicolariopsis dohertyi 
Limicolariopsis donaldsoni 
Limicolariopsis elgonensis 
Limicolariopsis ellisi 
Limicolariopsis inepta 
Limicolariopsis keniana 
Limicolariopsis kivuensis 
Limicolariopsis laevis 
Limicolariopsis nyiroensis 
Limicolariopsis obtusa 
Limicolariopsis percurta 
Limicolariopsis perobtusa 
Limicolariopsis ruwenzoriensis 
Limicolariopsis sjostedti 
Limicolariopsis verdcourti 
Limicolariopsis wagneri

References

Gastropods